The Karoo rock elephant shrew or Karoo rock sengi (Elephantulus pilicaudus) is an elephant shrew in the genus Elephantulus. It is found in Northern Cape Province and Western Cape Province in South Africa.

References

Endemic fauna of South Africa
Elephant shrews
Mammals described in 2008
Mammals of South Africa